Ginimal Pokuru is a 2021 Sri Lankan Sinhala adult romantic film directed by Udayakantha Warnasuriya. The film is co-produced by Prasad Rodrigo, Bandula Gunawardena, Krishantha Hettiarachchi, Nishantha Jayawardena, Udayanga Suresh, Suranga de Alwis and Newton Vidanapathirana for U Creations. It stars Isuru Lokuhettiarachchi, Chulakshi Ranathunga and Charith Abeysinghe in lead role whereas Ananda Kumaraunnahe, Dilrufa Shanas and Kumara Wanduressa made supportive roles.

Production
This is the 25th cinematic feature film directed by Udayakantha Warnasuriya. The filming began on 22 April 2021, but postponed due to COVID-19 pandemic in the country after few shooting schedule. The rest of the filming was started on 15 August 2021. Cinematography was done by Ayeshmantha Hettiarachchi, edited by Praveen Jayaratne, assisted by Donald Jayantha and art direction by Eheliyagoda Somathilaka. Sarath de Alwis is the music director, Indika Udaralanka is the costume designer and Ashoka Ariyaratne is the production manager.

Plot

Cast
 Isuru Lokuhettiarachchi as Ranga 
 Chulakshi Ranathunga as Piyumi 
 Charith Abeysinghe as Lasith
 Ananda Kumaraunnahe
 Dilrufa Shanas as Tharushi
 Kumara Wanduressa

Release
For the first time in the history of Sri Lankan cinema, two cinema boards came together to screen the film: LFD and CEL cinema boards. The film is based on a true story that took place in Sri Lanka twenty years ago. The Performance Board certified the film as an adults-only film and the film was released on 3 December 2021.

References

External links

 Official trailer

2021 films
2020s Sinhala-language films
2021 romantic drama films
Sri Lankan romantic drama films
Films directed by Udayakantha Warnasuriya